Love in the City (Nan cai nu mao) is a 2007 Hong Kong film directed by Jingle Ma.

Plot
Young traffic cop Yang Le (Shawn Yue) sees kindergarten teacher Xiao You (Gao Yuanyuan) leading her kids to cross the road every day. While he starts to have special feelings for her, he suddenly learns from a friend that she is a deaf-mute. Meanwhile, Yang's half-brother has a crush on a super star (Naoko Miyake) while working as her Chinese interpreter. But she will leave China when shooting is over. Can the four find true love in the end?

Cast
Gao Yuanyuan as  Xiao You 
Shawn Yue as Yang Le 
Naoko Miyake as Yuko Mizuno 
Takuya Suzuki as  Makoto Fukuda

External links
 
 Love in the City at the Chinese Movie Database

2007 films
Hong Kong romance films
2000s Cantonese-language films
2000s Hong Kong films